Primo is an album by the American band Rifle Sport. It was released in 1991 on Ruthless Records.

Critical reception
The Washington Post wrote: "The Twin Cities foursome ... sometimes produce Chicago-style death-rattle, but also skirt the borders of pop; the guitar lead on 'Jobs,' for example, is actually melodic, and 'Kings and I' includes a quiet interlude. Primo is hardly that, but it's a consistent, cohesive record from a band that has mastered, if not transcended, the form."

Track listing
"Exploding Man"
"Jobs"
"Black Shadow"
"Manfred"
"Positions"
"Clouds"
"24 Doors"
"Sun In The Sky"
"Kings And I"
"Jon"

Personnel
J. Christopher - vocals
Gerard-Jean Boissy - guitar
Flour - bass guitar
Todd Trainer - drums
Scott G. Kottke - artwork

References

Rifle Sport albums
1990 albums
Albums produced by Iain Burgess
Ruthless Records (Chicago) albums